Grace Lutheran College (GLC), founded in 1978, is a co-educational, private high school based in Rothwell and Caboolture in Queensland, Australia. Grace Lutheran Primary School is located in Clontarf, approximately a 10-minute drive from the main Grace College Campus at Rothwell. The current principal is David Radke, who took up the post in 2017 after the school's second principal, Ruth Butler, retired. The college's enrolment at the start of the 2011 school year was over 1800. Grace Lutheran College is a Christian school of the Lutheran Church of Australia.

History 
The college was first opened in 1977 with the Caboolture campus being founded in 2008. In February 1978, Viv Kuhl (retired deputy principal) became the first teacher at the school with an initial pupil count of 15. In 1980 the school moved to Anzac Avenue in Rothwell with 55 students and 5 teachers and with Fred Stolz as the first headmaster.

Educational subjects

Academic
Grace Lutheran College currently enrols students in Years 7–12. Before 2008, the school only enrolled from year 8–12, however Year 7s were incorporated in 2015. This leaves years 7–9 as the middle school and 10–12 as the senior school. 2008 saw the completion of the Caboolture campus of Grace Lutheran College, currently enrolling year 7 to 12 students and was officially opened on 24 May 2008.

Each year, the college pays the entry fees for every one of its students to participate in the University of New South Wales academic competitions in Mathematics, Science, and English. The college often scores a high number of awards in these events. Subsequently, various departments allow students to enter academic competitions voluntarily, with the school paying the entry fees for the students to do so.

Performing arts

The college has a Performing Arts department which is called Grace Academy. Each year, Performing Arts students have a variety of plays and productions as part of their course, usually, but not always, including junior and doing senior productions every second year. Every second year, the college also hosts a musical production, which is often popular within the community. Almost all of the production cast and crew are made up of students, with directing taken up by Performing Arts teachers.

Robotics 
The School has a purpose-built Robotics teaching space; the college uses these facilities to train teachers and students in STEM developments in the area of Robotics. Staff from institutions in the United States and South East Asia have visited Grace Lutheran College to learn about FIRST Robotics Competition. In 2016, Grace participated in FRC again with their robot, Exodus, coming 27th out of 52 teams internationally, and in 2017 they participated with their robot, Ezra, where they came 8th out of 39 teams internationally and in the finals placing 6th.

Sport
The college promotes a variety of sports which includes Aussie Rules, Baseball, Basketball, Cricket, Futsal, Gaelic Football, Hockey, Netball, Rugby League, Rugby Union, Soccer, Softball, Squash, Tennis, Touch, Volleyball and Water Polo.

The college participated in the Moreton Bay and Caboolture district where it won a large majority of competitions. After winning the district or zone final, the school has the chance to compete in Metropolitan finals, where it won.

In 1996, Grace Lutheran College performed on the TV show A*mazing; they won against Vienna Woods. 

Grace Lutheran College is the current metropolitan champion in:

Open Girls Softball
Open Boys Soccer
Open Girls Soccer
Open Boys Australian Rules Football
Open Girls Golf (Ellen Davies-Graham)
Open Boys Futsal
BSGSA Girls Australian Rules Football 
Year 10 Girls Softball
Year 10 Baseball
Year 10 Boys Tennis
Year 10 Girls Basketball
Year 10 Girls Netball
Year 9 Girls Soccer
Year 8 Girls Netball
Vicki Wilson Girls Netball (Winner of Sunshine Coast)
Independent Schools Australia Rules Football

The school has no excellence or scholarship program in place but has a history of succeeding in district and metropolitan finals and co-curricular competitions such as ISSA, Uhlsport Cup, and Bill Turner Cup. Soccer achievements include the girls' Uhlsport Cup in 2006, the ISSA Cup in 1996, 1997, 2000, 2002, 2006, 2011, and 2012, and the final 8 of the 2007 Bill Turner Cup. The boys have also made the semi-finals in both the Uhlsport Cup in 2008 and Bill Turner Cup in 2007. In 2007, student Robbie Buhmann was also named star player of the 2007 Bill Turner Cup, a nationwide competition.

Notable alumni
Kylie Palmer – 2008 Olympic Gold Medalist
Jodie Bowering – 2008 Olympic Bronze Medalist
Joel Naughton – Philadelphia Phillies and national team catcher
Paul Aiton – Cronulla Sharks and Papua New Guinea national rugby league
Taylor McKeown – 2014 Commonwealth Games Medalist for 200m breaststroke
Izaack Powell – Brisbane Roar soccer player
 Kaylee McKeown – Olympic 3x Gold Medalist in 100m Backstroke, 200m backstroke and  medley. She is also a bronze medalist in 4 x 100 mixed medley and Youth Olympian. (at school briefly before transferring to Pacific Lutheran College)

A*Mazing 
They were in the show ages ago.

References

External links
Grace Lutheran College website

Private schools in Queensland
High schools in Queensland
Educational institutions established in 1978
Lutheran schools in Australia
Schools in South East Queensland
1978 establishments in Australia
High schools and secondary schools affiliated with the Lutheran Church